The list of ship launches in 1726 includes a chronological list of some ships launched in 1726.


References

1726
Ship launches